São Joaquim da Barra is a municipality in the state of São Paulo in Brazil. The population is 52,319 (2020 est.) in an area of 411 km². The elevation is 625 m.

References

Municipalities in São Paulo (state)